Mansehra Tehsil is a tehsil in Mansehra District, Khyber Pakhtunkhwa, Pakistan.

History
During British Rule, Mansehra was a tehsil of Hazara District, with larger boundaries than today, as described by the Imperial Gazetteer of India.

See also
 Mansehra

References

Mansehra District
Tehsils of Khyber Pakhtunkhwa